Un Homme libre or hommes libres may refer to:

Un Homme libre, an 1889 book by Maurice Barrès, part of The Cult of the Self trilogy
Un Homme libre, a 2000 solo album by Cheb Sahraoui
Comme un homme libre French title for the 1979 film The Jericho Mile

See also
Freeman (disambiguation)